The FC Kronach is a German association football club from the town of Kronach, Bavaria.

The club's greatest success have been its three seasons spent in the Fußball-Bayernliga, in 1971–72 and again from 1987 to 1989.

History
The club was formed on 5 April 1908. The club initially joined the leagues in neighbouring Thuringia due to the close proximity of Kronach to the border. After the First World War, the club started playing football in the Bavarian league system. In this era, the club managed a league championship in the A-Klasse Frankenwaldgau, which meant entitlement to enter the promotion round, where they were outplayed by clubs like FC Schweinfurt 05. After that, the club stagnated and was not particularly successful up until the mid-1960s.

The club first entered the tier-four Landesliga Bayern-Nord in 1967, a league formed four years earlier, and they were immediately competitive, finishing third in their first season there. After three seasons of upper table finishes, the side won the league in 1971 and earned promotion to the third division Bayernliga.

In the Bayernliga for the first time, in 1971–72, Kronach was struggling against relegation, eventually finishing 16th and three points from safety. Back in the Landesliga, FCK was not able to repeat past performances, coming eighth in their first year back and, after that, only achieving lower table finishes. Eventually, at the end of the 1977–78 season, the side was relegated back to the Bezirksliga.

Kronach spent the next six seasons at Bezirksliga level before once more making a return to the Landesliga. Again the club performed well as a newcomer, finishing fourth in their first two seasons back before they earned another league championship in 1987 and once more were promoted to the Bayernliga.

Back in Bavaria's highest league for a second stint, the club narrowly avoided relegation in their first year there, coming 13th and just a point clear of relegation. The following season, 1988–89, Kronach was only able to win three games and finished a distant last, 13 points clear of salvation.

In the Landesliga, the club achieved two good seasons after relegation, finishing fifth and sixth, but then declined and was relegated to the Bezirksoberliga Oberfranken in 1994. A league championship at this level however took the side straight back to the Landesliga. But overall, the club now entered an era of financial struggle, culminating in the necessity of having to sell its stadium to survive, which it since has been able to purchase back.

The team played three more seasons in the Landesliga from 1995 to 1998, followed by a permanent relegation from the league at the end of the 1997–98 season. FCK spent just as many seasons in the Bezirksoberliga from 1998 to 2001 before another relegation meant a permanent departure from this league, too. The club was handed straight through the Bezirksliga Oberfranken-West (VII) the following season and dropped down to the Kreisliga for the 2002–03 season.

The club played in the Bezirksliga once more in 2008–09 but came only 14th and was promptly relegated again. They made another return to the Bezirksliga in 2010 and were able to maintain the league this time round, playing in the league until 2014, when they were relegated again.

Honours
The club's honours:

League
 Landesliga Bayern-Nord
 Champions: 1971, 1987
 Bezirksoberliga Oberfranken
 Champions: 1995
 Bezirksliga Oberfranken-West
 Champions: 1967, 1984
 Kreisliga Coburg-Kronach
 Champions: 2008, 2010
 A-Klasse Frankenwaldgau
 Champions: 1925

Recent seasons
The recent season-by-season performance of the club:

With the introduction of the Bezirksoberligas in 1988 as the new fifth tier, below the Landesligas, all leagues below dropped one tier. With the introduction of the Regionalligas in 1994 and the 3. Liga in 2008 as the new third tier, below the 2. Bundesliga, all leagues below dropped one tier. With the establishment of the Regionalliga Bayern as the new fourth tier in Bavaria in 2012 the Bayernliga was split into a northern and a southern division, the number of Landesligas expanded from three to five and the Bezirksoberligas abolished. All leagues from the Bezirksligas onwards were elevated one tier.

References

Sources
 Die Bayernliga 1945–97  publisher: DSFS, published: 1998

External links
 Official club website  
 Das deutsche Fußball-Archiv  historical German domestic league tables
 Manfreds Fussball Archiv  Tables and results from the Bavarian amateur leagues

Football clubs in Germany
Football clubs in Bavaria
Football in Upper Franconia
Association football clubs established in 1908
1908 establishments in Germany